Neustadt (Dosse) is a town in the district of Ostprignitz-Ruppin, Brandenburg, Germany with a population of 3,575 (as of 2010). It has a total area of 75.43 km², and lies close to the river Dosse.

History 
Neustadt was founded in 1407 by the Count of Ruppin. In 1788, the Prussian king Friedrich William II expanded the town and his stud. Until today, the national stud of Brandenburg (Brandenburgisches Haupt- und Landgestüt, i.e. Brandenburgian Main and State Stud) is located in Neustadt which is thus a principal place of the horse breeding in Brandenburg, especially for horses of the Brandenburger breed.

Areas
Babe, Helenenhof, Kampehl, Köritz, Leddin, Lindenau, Neuhof, Neuroddahn, Plänitz, Schönfeld, Spiegelberg, and Strubbergshof.

Demography

Mayor
Sabine Ehrlich (SPD) was elected in May 2014 with 54,3 % of the votes for a term of five years.

Sightseeing 
The mummy of Christian Friedrich von Kahlbutz is located in Kampehl, which is a locality of Neustadt (Dosse).

Transportation 
At Neustadt, there is a train stop of the regional express on the Berlin–Hamburg Railway.

Sons and daughters of the town 

 Ludwig Jonas (1797-1859), theologian
 August Lindemann (1842-1921), architect
 Paul Gustaf Krause (1867-1945), paleontologist
 Fritz Thörner (1869-1940), writer

References

External links 

 Official website of Neustadt (Dosse) 

Localities in Ostprignitz-Ruppin
1407 establishments in Europe
Populated places established in the 1400s